General elections to the Cortes Generales were held in Spain in October 1836. At stake were all 149 seats in the Congress of Deputies, in order to adopt a new constitution to replace the Royal Statute of 1834. The Cortes eventually enacted the Constitution of 1837.

Electoral system

Right to vote
All male citizens older than 21 had the right to vote.

Constituencies
A majority voting system was used for the election, with 48 multi-member constituencies and 1 single-member constituency. Voting was secret and indirect.

Results

References

 Estadísticas históricas de España: siglos XIX-XX.

1836 elections in Spain
1836b
October 1836 events